City Beach is a beachside suburb of Perth, Western Australia, located within the Town of Cambridge. Its postcode is 6015. It is also the name of a beach in the suburb. House prices are generally quite expensive. In 2020, City Beach had the fifth highest median house price in Perth, at $1.628 million.

City Beach consists of three sections: a northern section (bordering Scarborough), a central section (bordering Wembley Downs and Floreat) and a southern section (bordering Bold Park). The centre part was built immediately prior to the 1962 British Empire and Commonwealth Games as an athletes' village due to its proximity to Perry Lakes Stadium in neighbouring Floreat.

History
The Board proposed to lay out an up-to-date seaside town near the ocean beach on garden city lines, embodying approved Town Planning principles, and making ample provision for recreation purposes. By 1928, the Board had allocated finance to commence work, and also referred to the beach as "City Beach". It appears this name developed because it was an area developed by the City Council and much more acceptable than "Ocean Beach".

On 9 December 2005, City Beach Senior High School was closed by the Department of Education and Training due to a lack of new student enrolments and the opening of Shenton College 5 kilometres away in 2000.

Recreation
Activities could be divided into that which takes place within the suburb of City Beach and that which takes place on the same-named beach. The area contains a football/cricket oval, numerous other grassy parks, as well a large area of bush land with a walking trail.

City Beach has two major beaches (Floreat Beach and the eponymous City Beach) as well as a dog beach. Each of those beaches has its own competitive surf lifesaving club with all the associated facilities. Surfing is popular in the region and City Beach commonly has reasonable surf conditions for beginner to intermediate, although the break (particularly in summer) is often a shore break that can be hazardous at times. Kitesurfing and windsurfing are also summer activities that are frequently seen at City Beach.  The sand is white/yellow and soft, making it an ideal surface for the beach volleyball courts and matkot. The main swimming and surfing area is protected between two groynes and it is overlooked by lawns.

There are expansive sand dunes and bushland areas along the coast, which are home to wildlife such as hawks, mice and rabbits, and the occasional dugite. These dunes are currently under repair, and should not be entered, as the presence of people interferes with the rehabilitation of the dunes native plant and animal wildlife.

Education
 City Beach Senior High School (closed 2005)
 City Beach Primary School
 Kapinara Primary School
 Holy Spirit Catholic Primary School
 International School of Western Australia
 The Japanese School in Perth
City Beach Residential College, a student boarding facility

References

Suburbs of Perth, Western Australia
Beaches of Western Australia
Surfing locations in Western Australia
Suburbs in the Town of Cambridge